Second Island is an island in Ontario, Canada, located in Lake Erie north of Long Point.  The island was never inhabited, and is located between Ryerson's Island and Snow Island, which together with Second Island are three of the more notable islands near Long Point.

References

Islands of Lake Erie in Ontario